Riverhead is a station along the Main Line (Greenport Branch) of the Long Island Rail Road. It is located on Osborne Avenue and Railroad Street in Riverhead, New York, north of NY 25 (West Main Street) and the Suffolk County Court House.

History
Riverhead station was opened on July 29, 1844. The station is listed as River Head in the 1852 timetable. The original station house was moved for use as a railroad bunkhouse in March 1870 and the second depot was opened the same month. Between 1891 and 1969, it contained a turntable, water tower, and pump house. The third depot was opened on June 2, 1910, but the agency was closed on November 13, 1972. The station house was used for signal maintainers until the end of the 20th century.

Riverhead station was restored in 2000–2001 with a high-level side platform and a fourth station house similar to 1910-built one, and it was sold to the Town of Riverhead in 2001. However, the station house has been closed to the public in response to a rash of vandalism, theft, and even misuse as a bathroom. The station house is owned by the Town of Riverhead and the MTA uses a high level platform and other amenities instead. The station is also near the west end of the Riverhead Restoration Site of the Railroad Museum of Long Island. A collection of historic Long Island Rail Road cars and maintenance equipment can be found near the station.

Station layout
This station has one high-level side platform south of the tracks that is long enough for one and a half cars to receive and discharge passengers. The Main Line has two tracks at this location and a small yard with three tracks.

Nearby attractions
 Long Island Aquarium and Exhibition Center

References

External links 

Old Riverhead Station (Ron Ziel collection -- LIRR Unofficial History Website)
Riverhead Freight Sidings (TrainsAreFun.com)
Railroad Museum of Long Island (Riverhead)
Station entrance from Google Maps Street View
Old Station House from Google Maps Street View

Long Island Rail Road stations in Suffolk County, New York
Riverhead (town), New York
Railway stations in the United States opened in 1844
1844 establishments in New York (state)